J. Kevin Dorsey is an American academic administrator and physician serving as interim president of the Southern Illinois University. Dorsey was previously the Dean, Provost and Professor of Internal Medicine of the Southern Illinois University School of Medicine.

Education 
Dorsey earned his bachelor's degree at Fairfield University in 1964, and his doctoral degree in physiological chemistry at University of Wisconsin–Madison in 1968. He was a postdoctoral fellow in biology at Johns Hopkins University from 1970 to 1973. After earning his medical degree at Southern Illinois University in 1978, he completed his internal medicine residency and a two-year fellowship in rheumatology at the University of Iowa in Iowa City in 1981 and 1983.

Career
Dorsey joined the Southern Illinois University at Carbondale faculty as assistant professor of chemistry and biochemistry in 1973 and then returned to earn his medical degree at Southern Illinois University in 1978. After additional training, he rejoined the faculty in 1983 when he was named an assistant professor and coordinated clinical teaching activities for first-year medical students. In 1998, Dorsey was named as associate provost for the southern region in Carbondale. For 15 years, he also was a rheumatologist with The Carbondale Clinic. The board of trustees at Southern Illinois University appointed Dorsey dean and provost of the School of Medicine on August 16, 2002. He was appointed interim president of the Southern Illinois University system on July 16, 2018.

Awards
In 1993, Dorsey was the first Southern Illinois University School of Medicine graduate to be named a Distinguished Alumnus. Dorsey was awarded a John Templeton Spirituality in Medicine Curricular Award in 2000.

References

External links
SIU School of Medicine Faculty Bio: J. Kevin Dorsey
University of Iowa College of Medicine Alumni Society Interview

Living people
Fairfield University alumni
University of Wisconsin–Madison alumni
Johns Hopkins University alumni
University of Iowa alumni
Year of birth missing (living people)
Medical educators
Southern Illinois University faculty